Saint o'Clock is the first studio album by South Korean boy band 2AM. The album was released in digital and physical format by October 26, 2010. The songs "You Wouldn't Answer My Calls" and "Like Crazy" were chosen as the title tracks.

Track listing

 On the Japanese edition of the album, the track "Can't Love You Again" was replaced by the Jo Kwon's solo song "The Day I Confessed", and moved for the last track of the album.

Charts

Album chart

Single chart

References

External links 
 Official Website

2010 albums
JYP Entertainment albums
Kakao M albums
Korean-language albums
2AM (band) albums
Hybe Corporation albums